One Washington Park is a high rise office building located on Harriet Tubman Square at 1 Washington Street in Newark, New Jersey. Among the tallest buildings in the city, it is best known as the home of Rutgers Business School, Amazon's Audible.com, and Newark Venture Partners.

History
One Washington Park was originally built by the Bell Telephone Company's New Jersey Bell (later Verizon) to serve as the local network operations center in 1983. Marc E. Berson's Fidelco Group purchased the building for $26.5 million in 2004  and renovated the building to class A office space that became available for move-in in 2005. Rutgers University purchased the first 11 floors of the building from Fidelco for $31.5 million in 2006 and invested $51.5 million in renovating them before opening the new business school facility in 2009.

In July 2015, Newark Venture Partners, a venture fund aimed to raise $50 million to invest in a select group of start-up tech companies, all of which will be housed in a so-called "accelerator", in a joint effort with Audible, which would provide mentorship,  and Rutgers, which would provide space.

Tenants
Floor 1
 Rutgers Business School
 Washington Park Fidelco LLC
 Aramark (One Park Bistro)
Floors 2–6, 8–11
 Rutgers Business School
Floor 7
 Newark Venture Partners and its accelerator program, NVP Labs
 Multiple NVP Labs portfolio companies
Floor 12
 SEIU New Jersey State Council
Floor 13
 National Football League Alumni
Floors 14–17
 Audible (an Amazon company)

Amenities

 Health Club
 Cafeteria (One Park Bistro)
 Banking
 Conference Center
 On-Site Parking

Vicinity
It is near highways and public transportation, notably Interstate 280 and Newark Broad Street Station, where there is service on New Jersey Transit Morris and Essex and Montclair-Boonton Lines (including non-stop Midtown Direct service to New York Penn Station) and Newark Light Rail service to Newark Penn Station. The Harriet Tubman Square light rail station is also nearby.

Rutgers Business School
One Washington Park is home to Rutgers' full-time and Executive MBA programs, MQF program, and the Newark undergraduate program. The flex time MBA as well as the New Brunswick undergraduate programs are located on Rutgers' Livingston Campus in New Brunswick, New Jersey. RBS facilities in 1 Washington Park include classrooms, lecture halls, conference rooms, student and faculty lounges, offices, and a University Police substation. The new 3 story RBS entrance atrium features a digital ticker tape, lecture halls, a trading floor, student lounge and study spaces, a rooftop garden, and the Bove Auditorium. One Park Bistro in the lobby of the building is owned by the university and operated by the university's contracted Aramark food service but is open to all tenants with a building ID. In 2011, it was announced the Rutgers–Newark campus would further expand around Washington Park, converting the former American Insurance Company Building into graduate student housing.

Audible.com
Audible's offices feature a contemporary open office layout that fosters collaboration and cooperation, an entrance that displays audiobook titles and plays clips of recorded books, an original Amazon door table signed by Jeff Bezos, custom-built furniture in Audible's corporate colors, conference rooms named after notable people and places in Newark's history that can be reserved using a touch pad interface located outside each conference room door, an open staircase that wraps around the Walters-Storyk-designed recording studios used to produce audiobooks, and their own combination cafeteria, lounge, and auditorium space with kitchen.

See also
 List of tallest buildings in Newark

References

External links
 Official website
 audible.com building web page
 Rutgers building web page
 1WP Youtube video

Skyscraper office buildings in Newark, New Jersey
Rutgers University buildings
Office buildings completed in 1983